Frederico Emanuel Tavares Martins (born 14 August 1979 in Estarreja, Aveiro District), known as Fredy, is a Portuguese former footballer who played mainly as a left back.

Honours
CFR Cluj  
Liga I: 2007–08
Cupa României: 2007–08

References

External links

1979 births
Living people
Portuguese footballers
Association football defenders
Primeira Liga players
Liga Portugal 2 players
Segunda Divisão players
F.C. Felgueiras players
Associação Académica de Coimbra – O.A.F. players
F.C. Paços de Ferreira players
Gil Vicente F.C. players
Anadia F.C. players
Segunda División B players
RCD Mallorca B players
Liga I players
CFR Cluj players
Alki Larnaca FC players
Portugal youth international footballers
Portugal under-21 international footballers
Portuguese expatriate footballers
Expatriate footballers in Spain
Expatriate footballers in Romania
Expatriate footballers in Cyprus
Portuguese expatriate sportspeople in Spain
Portuguese expatriate sportspeople in Romania
Portuguese expatriate sportspeople in Cyprus
Portugal B international footballers
Sportspeople from Aveiro District